P. R. Senthilnathan (born 1968) is a politician from Tamil Nadu. He was born in Nagadi village in the Sivaganga district. He studied at Sevugan Annamalai college in Devakottai. After finishing his B.Sc. he went to Bengaluru to study for an LL.B. degree in Bengaluru University. He started out as a lawyer and became well known for his good skills. He entered politics in 1988 by joining AIADMK. He made a small beginning in the party as its Nagadi branch secretary in 1992 and served as district secretary of Amma Peravai between 2007 and 2013. He was appointed Sivgangai district secretary of AIADMK in April 2013, and Chairman of Tamil Nadu Backward Classes and economic development corporation in June 2013.

In 2014 he was announced as Sivaganga Loksabha candidate by the Party Head Honourable Chief Minister Jayalalithaa. With a difference of 229,385 votes in the 2014 Loksabha election he defeated H. Raja, the Tamil Nadu BJP Vice President and Karthi P. Chidambaram, (son of P. Chidambaram, the country's former Finance Minister ), winning his party the election for the first time in 34 years in Sivaganga constituency.

References

Living people
People from Sivaganga district
1968 births
India MPs 2014–2019
Lok Sabha members from Tamil Nadu
Tamil Nadu MLAs 2021–2026